Kołaczyce  is a town in Jasło County, Subcarpathian Voivodeship, in south-eastern Poland. It is the seat of the gmina (administrative district) called Gmina Kołaczyce.

Kołaczyce was first mentioned in 1339, and gained town rights in 1354 to lose them in 1919. It regained town status on 1 January 2010, along with five other Polish localities.

History 
The village of Kolaczyce was founded probably in late 13th century, as property of the Benedictine Abbey from Tyniec. In 1339, it received town charter from King Kazimierz Wielki. At that time, it was part of Sandomierz Voivodeship, in which it remained for the next 400 years, until the first partition of Poland (1772). In 1474, Kolaczyce was burned to the ground by a Hungarian raid commanded by Thomas Tarczay. In 1546, the town burned in a great fire, while in 1657, it was completely destroyed by Transilvanian forces of George II Rakoczi (see Swedish invasion of Poland). In the past, Kolaczyce was spelled Colanthicze 1330, Colaczicze 1358; and Colacice 1401.

In 1772, Kolaczyce was annexed by the Habsburg Empire, and remained in Austrian Galicia until November 1918. In 1919, it lost its town status, regaining it in 2010. In the 19th century, Kolaczyce was famous for its shoe makers, which annually made app. 40 000 pairs of shoes. In the Second Polish Republic, Kolaczyce belonged to Krakow Voivodeship. During World War II, the village suffered from heavy destruction; its Jewish minority was decimated.

During the Second World War, Nazis gathered 260 Jews from the nearby town of Brzostek, and surrounding villages, marched them a few miles south along the road No. 73, and—having escorted them in groups of ten to a spot in the Podzamcze forest—killed them and buried in a mass grave. The place is marked by a memorial officially unveiled on 17 June 2012.

Sights 
 Market square with a fountain and 19th-century houses (including a house from 1792),
 St. Ann parish church with a 1632 holy water font,
 Roadside chapel (first half of 19th century),
 A figure of Our Lady in the market square (1803),
 World War I and World War II cemeteries.

References

External links
 Information about the unveiling ceremony on Kołaczyce Community website

Cities and towns in Podkarpackie Voivodeship
Jasło County
Lesser Poland
Kingdom of Galicia and Lodomeria
Kraków Voivodeship (1919–1939)
Holocaust locations in Poland